The bombing of Munich (Luftangriffe auf München) took place mainly in the later stages of World War II. Munich was, and is, a significant German city, as much culturally as industrially. Augsburg, thirty-seven miles to the west, was a main centre of diesel engine production (and still is today), and was also heavily bombed during the war. Although some considerable distance from the United Kingdom, Munich is not a difficult city to find from the air, mainly due to its size, and possibly its proximity to the Austrian Alps to the south-east as a visual reference point. Munich was protected (initially) by its distance from the United Kingdom.

There were seventy-four air raids on Munich, with 6,632 people killed and 15,800 wounded. 
Around 90% of the Altstadt (old city) was severely damaged due to the policy of carpet bombing (Flächenbombardement). Munich was considered a special target of allies bombings also for propaganda purposes, in that it was the "movement's capital city", Nazi Party's  birthplace. At the start of the Großdeutsches Reich in 1939, Munich had a population of around 830,000, and was the fourth-largest city in Germany.

Air force units involved
Munich was bombed by RAF Bomber Command and the USAAF.

24–25 April 1944 attack

USAAF
During the day of 24 April 1944 the city and the surrounding area was heavily attacked by the USAAF. Over seven hundred bomber aircraft took part in the attack, and were escorted by P-51B, P-38J, and P-47D aircraft, with around eight hundred fighter aircraft. The Boeing B-17 Flying Fortress and Consolidated B-24 Liberator bomber aircraft came from the 8th and 9th Air Forces. 

The attack was intended to limit production of the Dornier Do 335 at Dornier Flugzeugwerke, Oberpfaffenhofen and turbine blades for the Junkers Jumo 004 axial-flow turbojet. Oberpfaffenhofen is now the home of the mission control center Deutsches Raumfahrt-Kontrollzentrum of the Deutsches Zentrum für Luft- und Raumfahrt e.V. (German Aerospace Centre).

RAF
April 24, 1944, 234 Lancasters and 16 Mosquito aircraft from the RAF attacked Munich. It was a devastating and concentrated attack, and around 80% of the buildings in the target area were destroyed. The attack was noted for a new method of target marking at low level from 700 feet. Karlsruhe, further to the north-west, was also heavily bombed by the RAF that night. Nine Lancaster aircraft were lost in the raid.

Damage
The city received around 450 large bombs (Luftminen, around 4,000lb), 61,000 high-explosive bombs, and around 3,316,000 4lb magnesium incendiary bombs (Stabbrandbombe, developed by ICI). Around 50% of all of Munich was damaged. 81,500 houses were completely or partially destroyed, de-housing around 300,000 inhabitants, 4,185 wounded, 139 killed. (The deadliest bombing took place on 16 July 1944, with 1,453 killed and 4,525 wounded).

See also
 History of Munich
 Bombing of Augsburg in World War II
 Strategic bombing during World War II
 List of strategic bombing over Germany in World War II

References

 Fliegeralarm – Luftangriffe auf München von 1940 bis 1945, Hugendubel, Munich, 1987, Richard Bauer
 Ruinen-Jahre. Bilder aus dem zerstörten München 1945–1949, Hugendubel, Munich, 1988, Richard Bauer
 Bomber über München. Der Luftkrieg 1939 bis 1945, dargestellt am Beispiel der 'Hauptstadt der Bewegung' , Hans-Günter Richardi, 1992
 Der Luftkrieg über München 1942–1945. Bomben auf die Hauptstadt der Bewegung, Aviatic, Oberhaching, 1996,

External links
 Der Luftkrieg gegen München

1940s in Munich
1944 in Germany
Munich
Munich
Events in Munich
Germany–United Kingdom military relations
Munich